Harry August Lunte (September 15, 1892 – July 27, 1965) was a Major League Baseball shortstop. Lunte played for the Cleveland Indians in the 1919 and 1920 seasons. In 49 career games, Lunte had 29 hits, nine RBIs, two doubles, and a .196 batting average. Lunte was a member of the 1920 World Series championship team.

Lunte was the pinch runner for shortstop Ray Chapman after Chapman was hit in the head by a pitch thrown by New York Yankees pitcher Carl Mays on August 16, 1920. Chapman died the next day, becoming Major League Baseball's second fatality.

He was born and died in St. Louis, Missouri.

External links

1892 births
1965 deaths
Baseball players from St. Louis
Cleveland Indians players
Major League Baseball shortstops
Mason City Claydiggers players